Kaaka Muttai (released internationally as The Crow's Egg) is a 2015 Indian Tamil-language comedy drama film written, directed and filmed by M. Manikandan, in his directorial debut. Jointly produced by Dhanush's Wunderbar Films, Vetrimaaran's Grass Root Film Company and distributed by Fox Star Studios, it stars newcomers Vignesh and Ramesh, alongside Aishwarya Rajesh, Ramesh Thilak, Yogi Babu in supporting roles and Silambarasan in a cameo appearance. The film's storyline revolves around two slum children of Chennai, whose desire is to taste a pizza.

Vetrimaaran approached Manikandan in a film festival, after he saw one of his short films being screened. When asked by Vetrimaaran to develop a script, Manikandan wrote a storyline based on slum children and also inspired incidents from his life. Then the team cast real children living in the slum, in order to have a realistic approach. Following an official announcement in mid-January 2013, the film began production in that May. It was shot in real slums and streets across Chennai within 61 working days. The film explores the themes of class-based discrimination, consumerism and media sensationalism. The film's soundtrack and score is composed by G. V. Prakash Kumar and editing was done by Kishore Te.

The film had its world premiere on 5 September 2014 at the 39th Toronto International Film Festival, and was further screened at many other film festival circuits before its worldwide theatrical release on 5 June 2015. It opened to widespread critical acclaim praising the performances of the cast members, storyline, screenplay, direction and other major technical aspects. In addition to the critical and audience response, the film further achieved commercial success at the box-office. Kaaka Muttai was occasionally listed at the "Best Tamil Films of 2015". It was further considered one of the "25 Greatest Tamil Films of the Decade" by Film Companion; the same website ranked the actors Vignesh and Ramesh's and Aishwarya Rajesh's performance as two of the "100 Greatest Performances of the Decade". The film is remade in Marathi as Half Ticket (2016).

Kaaka Muttai won the National Award for Best Children's Film and Best Child Artist, for the actors Ramesh and Vignesh, at the 62nd National Film Awards.  It was the strong contender to be shortlisted for the Indian submissions for the Academy Award for Best Foreign Language Film but lost to the Marathi-language film Court (2015). At the 63rd Filmfare Awards South, the film won the Filmfare Award for Best Film, out of its four nominations in the Tamil branch. M. Manikandan received an award for Best Debut Director at the 5th South Indian International Movie Awards, where it was nominated in other four categories. The film also won six Tamil Nadu State Film Awards, six Ananda Vikatan Cinema Awards, two Norway Tamil Film Festival Awards and an Edison Awards. In July 2017, the Tamil Nadu government announced State Film Awards for films released during the 2009–2014 period in which Kaaka Muttai won three awards: Best Actress (Aishwarya Rajesh), Best Child Artist (Vignesh and Ramesh) and a Special Prize for Best Film.

Plot 
In a tiny concrete-and-tin Chennai home in the slums live two young brothers with their mother and grandmother. With the boys' father in prison for unknown reasons and with an ageing mother-in-law, the mother does her best to keep the kitchen fires burning. The brothers spend their time playing games and stealing and devouring eggs from crows' nests. Their love for these eggs leads them to start calling themselves Periya Kaaka Muttai (Big Crow Egg) and Chinna Kaaka Muttai (Small Crow Egg).

The young boys constantly beg their mother and grandmother for toys they cannot afford and later for a television. They don't yet understand that the two women can't give them everything they want. When their mother and grandmother finally do bring home a television, a gift from the government to ration card holders who live below the poverty line, it's like the opening of a portal. The boys see a pizza commercial on TV whose steaming, slow-motion images make the unfamiliar food look like manna from heaven. Meanwhile, a brand new pizzeria comes up in the neighbourhood, and actor Silambarasan alias Simbu comes to its opening. Remembering the looks of enjoyment on Simbu's face when he tasted a pizza at the pizzeria, the boys thereafter think of nothing else but getting their first taste of a pizza.

The brothers go to the railway tracks each morning to collect the charcoal that falls off goods trains. They sell the charcoal at a scrap metal shop and are paid for their trouble. They usually hand the money over to their mother, who is saving up to pay their lawyer to get her husband out of jail. But once the boys become aware of the cost of a pizza, they begin saving the money for themselves instead, lying to their mother that they have not collected any charcoal since they were out playing. The boys succeed in saving the ₹ 300 required to buy a pizza but are shooed away by the watchman of the pizza shop since they are badly dressed, which reflects the fact that they are local slum-dwellers. The boys narrate this story to their friend Pazharasam who works as a lineman with the Railways. He tells them that people place a lot of importance on clothes and advises them to save up and purchase new dresses before approaching the pizza outlet again.

The boys go on to work again to save money for buying new clothes at Chennai Citi Centre. In the meantime, they show their grandmother the pamphlet from the pizza shop. She tries to make them a home-cooked pizza using dosa batter as base, but the boys deride her attempts and insult her. After finally saving up enough money for new dresses when the boys see Citi Centre, they realise that it is another big mall which would definitely not allow them inside. But they somehow manage to acquire a newly bought pair of clothes from a couple of rich children by buying them panipuri from a street vendor, much against the wishes of the rich boys' father, who had denied them the treat as he considered it unhygienic.

The happy brothers return to the pizza shop in their new dresses. Another group of slum boys who are envious and sceptical about the brothers' story about going to eat pizza follow them to take a video of what transpires with the brothers at the pizza shop. The brothers are once again confronted by the watchman and he now forces them to go home right away, but the boys protest by saying that they have money and are wearing new clothes. This argument attracts the attention of the pizzeria supervisor who comes out and slaps the older brother. This is caught on video by the other slum kids who laugh at the brothers' humiliation. The sad and disappointed brothers return to their slum only to be further overwhelmed by the miserable sight of their dead grandmother. The brothers feel guilty when they remember insulting their grandmother some time before.

When two men in the slum happen to watch the video of the boy being slapped, they try to make money by threatening the owner of the pizza shop to release the video to the media. The owner realises he could be imprisoned and his pizzeria sealed by the government due to his supervisor's act of discrimination and violence against slum children. He offers one of the men a hundred thousand rupees for not making the video public. The man agrees, but his associate releases it to the media hoping to make some money (unaware of the huge sum being offered). This stirs up tension amongst the pizzeria's owners who finally decide to publicly apologise to the slum kids. The boys are welcomed to the pizza spot in a red carpet reminiscent of Simbu being welcomed in the opening ceremony of the pizzeria. The owner also promises them free pizzas for life. Even as the brothers begin to finally enjoy their first pizza, they tell each other that the dosa-pizza which their grandmother had earlier made for them had tasted much better.

Cast 

 J. Vignesh as Periya Kaaka Muttai (Big Crow Egg)
 V. Ramesh as Chinna Kaaka Muttai (Small Crow Egg)
 Aishwarya Rajesh as Kaaka Muttai's mother
 Nivas Adithan as Kaaka Muttai's father
 Shanthi Mani as Periya Kaaka Muttai & Chinna Kaaka Muttai's grandmother
 Babu Antony as Shiva Chidambaram
 Joe Malloori as Pazharasam
 Ramesh Thilak as Naina
 Yogi Babu as Naina's friend
 Vazhakku En Muthuraman as Police Officer
 Vettai Muthukumar as Pizza spot's supervisor
 Vijay Muthu as Pavadai
 R. S. B. Arivalagan as Drunkard
 Rajasekhar
 Krishnamoorthy as Shiva Chidambaram's assistant
 Sumathi as Pavadai's wife
 Silambarasan as himself in a guest appearance

Production

Development 

M. Manikandan, a former wedding photographer, had directed a short film named Wind in late 2010, primarily for his cinematography in the film. It was critically raved by cinephiles and other celebrities, and also got the attention of director Vetrimaaran, when the film was screened at a film festival, where he was a jury member. Vetrimaaran personally approached Manikandan, to ask about his other future film projects, where Manikandan narrated a script about slum children and its essence, impressed and decided to produce the film under his Grass Root Film Company banner. He later called Manikandan to meet him and Dhanush in Delhi to progress about the narration of the script and storyline, but Dhanush said that he liked the script and also joined the film as a co-producer under the Wunderbar Films banner. Vetrimaaran said that the storyline has an artistic approach and had similarities to Slumdog Millionaire (2008).

The script's basic plot line is inspired from his life, where his son often have craved for pizza, but he could have a little money to buy it, one day. Then he inspired that "what if someone who couldn't afford a pizza wished to have one", which he kept as a basic idea pitching the story line. To develop the conflict stronger, he characterised the lead artists as slum children and also realized that the kids get attracted to things only because of catchy advertisements. Initially, he had planned to produce the film on his own, through crowdfunding, where he suggested his friends to send money for the production of the project, before Vetrimaaran agreed to produce the film. On the occasion of Republic Day (26 January 2013), both Dhanush and Vetrimaaran announced the project officially under the title Kaaka Muttai.

Casting and filming 
For a children's film, Manikandan eventually planned to cast professional kids from the film, but as he was not convinced with their performances, he made a visit to real slums across Mylapore to pick slum children, who do not have an acting experience. In the process, he picked J. Vignesh and Ramesh, hailing from the fishermen community, both under 15. Manikandan also trained the kids and gave a lot of rehearsals before the shoot. He eventually said that, "During shooting both of them would fight with each other often. But on screen they will look like siblings." He added that the kids will play the lead protagonists and there are no typical male or female leads. Aishwarya Rajesh was roped to play the mother of the siblings. She was very hesitant at first to play a mother role at such an early stage in her career, but, after seeking advice from her Pannaiyarum Padminiyum co-star Vijay Sethupathi, she decided to be part of the film. Producer Vetrimaaran was initially skeptical to cast Aishwarya Rajesh and thought it would be more apt to cast an actual mother from the slums. Yogi Babu and Ramesh Thilak appear in supporting roles. While Manikandan handled the cinematography, Kishore Te., who was a regular in Vetrimaaran's projects, was assigned as the film editor, which became one of the last works of the editor before his death in March 2013.

The principal photography began during late-May 2013, where the entire film will be completed within a single stretch of 61 days. In order to have a realistic approach, the makers shot the film entirely in real slums and streets of Chennai. In August 2013, Silambarasan accepted to make a cameo appearance in the film. He joined the team in September 2013 to film scenes alongside Babu Antony who plays a landlord. Manikandan said that, it was difficult to capture the real attitude of kids and bring it to the screen. Further, he faced challenges such as to get a similar expression in the next shot, and to avoid night shoots with kids. But he was aware of the challenges and worked on the film. The entire shooting of the film was wrapped up within March 2014.

Themes and influences 

Manikandan said that few scenes of the film had inspired from Not One Less, City of God and Slumdog Millionaire, based on the visual themes and setting in slums. He had pointed out a scene where the boys' mother (Aishwarya Rajesh) gives an interview to a news channel. But, however, as a similar scene was present in Not One Less, he had to delete that scene. The Times of India-based critic M. Suganth said that Manikandan's earnestness in the filmmaking invites comparison with Iranian films like Children of Heaven (1997).

Writing for American magazine The Hollywood Reporter, Jordan Mintzer called Kaaka Muttai "an allegory for the vast class differences that persist in India, revealing how people try to profit off a system that leaves little room for advancement." Another reviewer from the Indo-Asian News Service called that "the film is filled with layers aimed at different sections of the audience, one of them being urban poverty, the other being discrimination based on class system", but praised director for using humour as a theme to keep the film mostly light hearted, though it deals with a very serious subject. Arpita Bose, writing an article for The Times of India, said that the "theme is not culture-specific but contemporary and universal. At its core, the film is about the adventures of two slum boys in a world that is taking on a swanky avatar backed by moneyed entrepreneurs, shrewd politicians and loafing opportunists." Writing for the Film Companion website, Harsh B. H. Said that the film follows "the themes of class-divide and the perils of consumerism, with just the right amount of irony, without coming off as preachy". In addition to the themes of class-based discrimination, the film was noted for media sensationalism listed by Surendhar M. K. of Firstpost, in his article about 'How media sensationalism drives diverse narratives in Tamil cinema'.

Soundtrack 

The film's four-song soundtrack and score was composed by G. V. Prakash Kumar. Kumar earlier worked with Manikandan in the short film Wind, and was brought on board for the project, due to his regular collaborations with Vetrimaaran, the film's producer. Na. Muthukumar penned down the lyrics for the songs in the film. The film's audio was released on 4 May 2015 at Suryan FM Radio Station and Prasad Labs in Chennai. Except for the film's composer, the entire cast and crew, including the producers Dhanush and Vetrimaaran attended the launch event and released the songs. Think Music marketed the soundtrack album.

Behindwoods rated the album three out of five, stating the album as "an impressive album from G. V. Prakash which speaks of innocence, hope and good days ahead in musical terms." Indiaglitz rated the album 3.25 out of five and said "one of Prakash's best works till date" Akilan Nagarajan of Moviecrow wrote the album as "simple, yet convincing tracks from Prakash" and gave three stars out of five. Karthik Srinivasan of Milliblog called the album as "GVP's best in a long time!" while Vipin Nair of Music Aloud rated the album 8 stars (out of 10), saying that the tracks are "light and likeable".

Release 
The film was selected to be screened at the 39th Toronto International Film Festival (TIFF), which was the first film by a debut Tamil director to have its world premiere at Toronto since the festival's inception in 1976. It had its world premiere under the international title The Crows Egg on 5 September 2014, and received standing ovation from the audience. In addition, the film was furthermore screened at the Rome Film Festival held during October 2014, and at the Dubai International Film Festival during late-December 2014. The film was further screened at the Brisbane Asia Pacific Film Festival, the Indian Film Festival of Los Angeles on 8 April 2015 (during the inaugural day of the ceremony), and also at the Gold Coast Film Festival.

The film's worldwide theatrical rights acquisition was brought by the corporate multi-media production house, Fox Star Studios, in order to ensure a wide reach towards the audience. Kaaka Muttais theatrical trailer was screened during the inaugural day premiere at IFFLA in Los Angeles, during April 2015, and was positively received by audience. Since it is a children's film, the producers planned to release on the occasion of summer holidays, to attract more family audience. In mid-May 2015, the makers announced that the film will be released on 5 June 2015. In addition to the theatrical release in India, the film was also screened at overseas countries, including United Arab Emirates, Malaysia, Singapore and Sri Lanka. The film was theatrically released in Karnataka on 19 June 2015, where the Karnataka Government granted tax-free in the state, becoming the first non-Kannada film to receive tax-exemption in Karnataka. It was theatrically released on Kerala on 26 June 2015.

The presenters of the film, Dhanush and Vetrimaaran, along with the distributor Fox Star Studios, associated with charitable non-government organization called Bhumi for the well-being of the actors. The company CEO, Vijay Singh, released a statement saying "The Chennai-based NGO will be entrusted with a substantial sum of money towards the food, education and additional needs of the two child actors. Bhumi will be entrusted with the responsibility of handling the money for the monthly expenses as well as monitoring the progress of the kids till they turn 21. At 21, the entire sum of money will be handed over to the kids for their future needs". The satellite rights of the film were sold to Star Vijay, and was premiered during the occasion of Independence Day (15 August 2015). The film was also released through the OTT-service Hotstar.

Reception

Box office 
In the first day of its release, Kaaka Muttai collected 90 lakh worldwide, with 40 lakh accounting from the Chennai city box-office collection from 144 shows. The film's collection steadily increased to 1.10 crore upon the second day and 1.35 crore on the third day, totalling up to ₹3.35 crore, as the three-day collection. According to trade analyst Trinath, the number was considered as a "phenomenal" figure, as the film had no star cast. The number of shows steadily increased from 192 screens, owing to the positive response from the audience, which boosted the weekday collections as the film had collected ₹85 lakh (on 8 June) and ₹92 lakh (on 9 June), respectively. The film had collected 7.1 crore, domestically at the first week of its release. Within ten days, the film had earned 8.6 crore, according to Taran Adarsh. The film's overall collection stands at ₹12 crore from three weeks. Its success at the box-office, was noted by trade analysts and film critics, that how content-oriented films triumph over commercial South Indian films. G. Dhananjayan also noted Kaaka Muttais success as an example, that how content-oriented films fare well, as few anticipated big-budget films in Tamil fared badly at the box-office. Many news articles, listed the film as one of the "most profitable films of 2015". Kaaka Muttai was listed second at Kollywood's hit-films produced in a limted budget in 2015 according to The Times of India. The film ran for 50 days in theatres.

Critical response 
Kaaka Muttai received universal critical acclaim, praising the direction, script, screenplay, performances and other technical aspects of the film. On the review aggregator website Rotten Tomatoes, the film received an average rating of 86% based on 15 reviews, with an average rating of 7.25/10.

India 
In his review for The Hindu, film critic Baradwaj Rangan called the film as an "outstanding debut" by Manikandan, going on to add, "This is one of the most assured debuts I've seen — one deserving of more than just that consolation-prize-of-a-National-Award [...] Kaaka Muttai is so entertaining that it's easy to forget how sad the undercurrents are". Writing for the same publication, Udhav Naig wrote, "Award-winning films have a troubled reputation amongst the general film audience. These films are brushed aside as ‘high-brow’ and ‘slow’. Debutant filmmaker M Manikandan's Kaaka Muttai [...] breaks from these imagined prejudices: Kaaka Muttai is a highly entertaining film, with a spotlight on poverty". Deepanjana Pal of Firstpost wrote, "Kaakka Muttai (is) one of the most charming films you'll see this year. It's beautifully shot, without making either slums or poverty look photogenic and exotic". Behindwoods gave 3.5 out of 5 and said " the beautifully made Kaakka Muttai will easily be one of the gems of Tamil cinema that will please all types of audience."

M. Suganth of The Times of India gave the film 4 stars out of 5 and wrote, "Manikandan's Kaaka Muttai is multi-layered; on the surface, it is all warm and inviting — a feel-good film about two kids and their simple desire and the earnestness in the filmmaking invites comparison with Iranian films like Children of Heaven...there is a hard base to it as well and from time to time, the film turns into a commentary on the class divide in our society and how it is exploited by wily politicians, an allegory of the effects of globalisation, and even a satire on media's obsession with sensationalism". S. Saraswathi of Rediff gave it 4 out of 5, too, calling it a "a delightful entertainer with a subtle message". A reviewer from Sify wrote, "(It's) A charming little treat of a film [...] Held together by a sharp screenplay that throws up some pleasant surprises, this film is light, easy and enjoyable. The film works because it is intelligent and uncompromising. Kaaka Muttai is a slice of life vibrant film which is sure to put a big smile on your face as you are stepping out of the movie hall."

Anupama Subramanian of Deccan Chronicle gave it 3.5 stars and wrote, "with unenhanced visuals that gives a sense of verisimilitude, acting that isn't staged and dramatised in any obvious sense, and more importantly, characters that bring alive a subsection of the populace, Kaakka Muttai is sure to make you at least a slightly better person than you were before, owing to the reflective power of the film". Writing for Hindustan Times, Gauthaman Bhaskaran gave 3.5 out of 5 stars wrote "A neatly packaged, well structured narrative with three dimensional characters, Kaaka Muttai (Crow's Egg) is a delight to behold". Uday Bhatia of Mint wrote, "the film invites us to admire the resourcefulness of the two siblings without turning them into objects of pity or sentiment. It's the strangest feel-good film you'll see this year: two kids in rags, happily walking past piles of garbage, their heads full of pizza". Shubhra Gupta of The Indian Express gave 3.5 out of 5 saying "Like all good films that children can watch, 'Kaakkaa Muttai' has many terrific take-aways, but they are delivered minus hammering." Suhani Singh of India Today wrote "Kaakka Muttai celebrates the joys of childhood and the vivid imagination of kids, who find a way to reach their goal even if it is the most arduous one."

Overseas 
Reviewing for the British news portal, The Guardian, Mike McCahill stated "M Manikandan's latter-day parable mines both laughter and tears from the struggles of two young brothers to put food on the table". Paul Byrnes, writing for The Sydney Morning Herald, said that "The vast Indian film industry produces many films like this – relatively unsophisticated in technique, but rich in observation and character detail. It's rare to see one with so much satirical edge, or such warm characterisation. The boys were recruited from a slum like the one we see. The style is not quite neo-realism, but that is the main ingredient, with large amounts of Tamil flavour." Jordan Mintzer of The Hollywood Reporter said "The Crow's Egg, is an amusing, energetic, occasionally poignant and somewhat unwieldy, that's part kids movie, part social drama, part Bollywood-style musical montage and part third world farce. And while all the parts do not necessarily form a perfect pie, the film provides some vivid moments and a handful of strong performances, which should help give it a boost". Mythili Ramachandran of Gulf News said "Without a star cast or exotic locations, here is a director who dared to present a simple story, without trapping himself in the regular mould of Tamil cinema." Writing for South China Morning Post, James Marsh said "The light-hearted and witty script [...] incorporates everything from political corruption to media manipulation, painting a rich and vibrant portrait of the contemporary Indian experience."

Film charts 

 1st – Baradwaj Rangan, The Hindu
 1st – Haricharan Pudipeddi, Sify
 1st – Siddharth Srinivas, Hindustan Times
 1st – Sreedhar Pillai, Firstpost
 1st – Moviecrow
 2nd – Indiaglitz
 3rd – Latha Srinivasan, Daily News and Analysis
 Top 10 (listed alphabetically) – 10 Contemporary Indian Tamil Films by Vogue India
 Top 25 (listed alphabetically) – Baradwaj Rangan, Film Companion South (25 Greatest Tamil Films of the Decade)
 Top 15 (listed alphabetically) The Hindu Cinema Team (Favourite Tamil Films of the Decade)
 Top 150 (listed alphabetically, not ranked) – All Time Cult Tamil Films by Behindwoods

Accolades

Remake 
Filmmaker Samit Kakkad watched the film at a festival in Mumbai and expressed his interest in adapting the film into Marathi language. Later he worked on that film, which was titled Half Ticket and altered the script in a minor way to include certain nuances of the Marathi language, by changed the setting to Mumbai instead of Chennai. G. V. Prakash Kumar retained the tracks of the original counterpart for this film, also making his Marathi debut. The film produced by Video Palace, alongside Fox Star Studios, which distributed the original film, released on 22 July 2016. The title was used in the latest Kannada movie Kaage Moote however the story appears to be inspired from a number of movies.

Notes

References

External links 
 

2014 films
Children's comedy-drama films
Films set in Chennai
Indian comedy-drama films
Indian children's films
2010s Tamil-language films
Films scored by G. V. Prakash Kumar
Films about discrimination
Films about consumerism
Tamil films remade in other languages
Best Children's Film National Film Award winners
Fox Star Studios films
2014 directorial debut films
2010s children's films
Films directed by M. Manikandan